Álvaro of Córdoba may refer to:

Paul Albar, also known as Álvaro of Córdoba (c. 800–861), Spanish scholar, poet and theologian
Álvaro of Córdoba (Dominican) (1350–1430), Spanish priest and saint